Waiting for Bojangles is a 2021 French-Belgian romantic drama film directed by , starring Romain Duris, Virginie Efira and Grégory Gadebois. It is an adaptation of Olivier Bourdeaut's novel of the same name.

Cast
 Romain Duris as Georges Fouquet
 Virginie Efira as Camille Fouquet
 Grégory Gadebois as Charles, dit l'Ordure
 Solàn Machado-Graner as Gary Fouquet
 Fabienne Chaudat as Marie-Françoise
  as Francine
  as a cocktail party guest
 Aurélia Petit as a teacher
  as a florist
  as a fire chief

Reception
Bobby LePire of Film Threat gave the film a score of 10/10 and called it "mesmerizing from start to finish."

Ray Gill of Willamette Week rated the film 4 stars out of 4 and called it an "uneasy thrill ride full of uncertainty, as any great love story should be."

Calum Marsh of The New York Times wrote that the "vision of a life of immeasurable joy and passion — one lived solely for love, without limits or qualifications — is beautiful", and while the film is in "constant jeopardy of seeming maudlin or, worse, a little corny", it is an "admirable problem".

Christy Lemire of RogerEbert.com rated the film 2 stars out of 4 and wrote that despite "charismatic" and "committed" performances from Duris and Efira, the film spends "much" of its "overlong" running time depicting mental illness as an "adorable personality quirk, a source of good-time party vibes, even a glamorous quality", and that once the "frothy French romance evolves into a more serious drama" it "turns turgid, causing a jarring tonal shift."

Josh Kupecki of the The Austin Chronicle rated the film 2 stars out of 5 wrote that the while the film "looks marvelous, with Roinsard artfully weaving through throngs of partygoers placed in vibrant, lived-in spaces and exotic locales", and Efira "continues her run of outstanding performances", she is "ultimately ill-served by a character and a film that’s removed any gravitas it seeks to instill by paradoxically not being removed enough."

References

External links
 
 

2021 films
2020s French films
2020s French-language films
French-language Belgian films
French romantic drama films
Belgian romantic drama films
2021 romantic drama films
Films based on French novels
French films based on novels